The Maulawin Spring Protected Landscape is a protected landscape area of forested hills and several rivers and streams located in the province of Quezon on southern Luzon island in the Philippines. It was originally created in 1939 to protect the watershed in the municipality of Guinayangan known as the Maulawin Spring Watershed Forest Reserve declared through Proclamation No. 365 by President Manuel Luis Quezon. In 2000, the forest reserve was enlarged and was redesignated as a protected landscape under the National Integrated Protected Areas System by virtue of Proclamation No. 295 issued by President Joseph Estrada. It is the only source of potable water for domestic consumption of the more than 40,000 residents of Guinayangan.

Geography
It sits on a hilly terrain in the eastern portion of the Tayabas Isthmus and the northeastern extreme of Bondoc Peninsula near Guinayangan's border with the municipalities of Calauag and Lopez. The park is traversed by several rivers and creeks, some of which dry up during the summer months and which empty into the Catabangan Bay and Ragay Gulf, including the Maulawin River, Hiwasayan River, Tubog Creek and Prenza River. These rivers supply water for the Guinayangan Water District. The topography of the park is characterized as a complex of land configuration ranging from slightly level, sloping to rolling, and steep to hilly and rugged mountains.

It is surrounded by private agricultural lands and coconut plantations in Ermita, San Roque, Dungawan and Sisi. It is accessible via the provincial road to Guinayangan from the Pan-Philippine Highway (AH26) in Calauag, thence by foot through numerous trails from barangays Sisi and Calimpak.

Biodiversity
The park is a forested area with sixty percent of its territory inhabited by dipterocarp trees, including molave, kamagong, guijo, red lauan, and white lauan, yakal and manggachapui. It is home to a diverse bird species, such as the Philippine dwarf kingfisher, rufous hornbill, northern sooty woodpecker, black-naped oriole, Philippine coucal, jungle crow, coleto, black-winged kite and Philippine collared dove. It also supports some large mammals, including the crab-eating macaque, Philippine deer, Philippine warty pig, Asian palm civet, as well several bats and snakes.

See also
 Quezon Protected Landscape

References

Protected landscapes of the Philippines
Springs of the Philippines
Geography of Quezon
Landforms of Quezon
Protected areas established in 1939
1939 establishments in the Philippines